Robert Lee Wilkerson (born August 15, 1954) is a retired American professional basketball player.

A 6'6" guard/forward born in Anderson, Indiana, Wilkerson attended Indiana University, where he was a member of the Hoosiers' 1976 NCAA Championship team. From 1976 to 1983 he played in the National Basketball Association as a member of the Seattle SuperSonics, Denver Nuggets, Chicago Bulls, and Cleveland Cavaliers. He averaged 10.1 points per game in his NBA career.

Head coaching record

References

External links

1954 births
Living people
African-American basketball coaches
African-American basketball players
American men's basketball players
Basketball coaches from Indiana
Basketball players from Indiana
Chicago Bulls players
Cleveland Cavaliers players
Colorado Buffaloes men's basketball coaches
Denver Nuggets players
Indiana Hoosiers men's basketball players
Maryland Eastern Shore Hawks men's basketball coaches
Seattle SuperSonics draft picks
Seattle SuperSonics players
Shooting guards
Small forwards
Sportspeople from Anderson, Indiana
21st-century African-American people
20th-century African-American sportspeople